The International Prognostic Scoring System (IPSS), published in 1997, is used by many doctors to help assess the severity of a patient's myelodysplastic syndrome (MDS). Based on the IPSS score, the patient's history, and his/her personal observations, the physician will design a treatment plan to address the MDS.

Process
The IPSS uses three "prognostic indicators" to develop a "score" which may be useful in understanding how the MDS may progress:

 the proportion of blast cells in the bonemarrow
 the type of chromosomal changes, if any, in the marrow cells
 the presence of one or more low blood cell counts (cytopenias)

Each indicator is rated according to its severity and the ratings are combined into a "score."

Scores are sorted into one of four risk categories:

 low
 intermediate-1
 intermediate-2
 high

The two lower categories can be further described as the lower risk group while the two upper categories can be further described as the higher risk group.

A revised IPSS, IPSS-R was published in 2012. IPSS-R is more refined in its prognostic precision and includes five instead of four prognostic groups.

References

Myeloid neoplasia